The FIBT World Championships 1960 took place in Cortina d'Ampezzo, Italy for the fifth time. The Italian city had hosted the event previously in 1937 (Two-man), 1939 (Four-man), 1950, and 1954. This was an extraordinary event because bobsleigh was not included in the program at the 1960 Winter Olympics in Squaw Valley, California.

Two man bobsleigh

The Italian duo of Monti and Alvera won their fourth straight championships in this event.

Four man bobsleigh

Medal table

References
2-Man bobsleigh World Champions
4-Man bobsleigh World Champions

IBSF World Championships
Sport in Cortina d'Ampezzo
1960 in bobsleigh
International sports competitions hosted by Italy
Bobsleigh in Italy 
1958 in Italian sport

de:Bob-Weltmeisterschaft 1999